Karl William Britton (born Scarborough, 12 October 1909 – died Northumberland, 23 July 1983) was a British philosopher. Throughout his entire career, Britton was interested in the philosophy of John Stuart Mill, on whom he published a book in 1953 which was long regarded as the standard student text.

Life
Britton was one of four children. His older sister was Clare Winnicott and his older brother, James, a noted academic. He attended Southend High School, and from 1927 to 1932 Clare College, Cambridge, where he gained his MA. His first academic appointment (1932–1934) was as Choate Fellow at Harvard University.

Works
 Communication: a Philosophical Study of Language, 1939
  John Stuart Mill, 1953, 2nd ed. 1970
 Philosophy and the Meaning of Life, 1969

References

1909 births
1983 deaths
People from Scarborough, North Yorkshire
20th-century British philosophers
Harvard University faculty
Academics of Swansea University
Academics of Durham University
Academics of Newcastle University
Harvard University alumni